The 2017 Swiss Indoors was a men's tennis tournament played on indoor hard courts. It was the 48th edition of the event, and part of the 500 series of the 2017 ATP World Tour. It was held at the St. Jakobshalle in Basel, Switzerland, from 23 October through 29 October 2017. The event was the final professional tennis tournament for Swiss player Marco Chiudinelli, who received wildcards into both the singles and the doubles draws.

Points and prize money

Point distribution

Prize money

Singles main-draw entrants

Seeds

 Rankings are as of October 16, 2017

Other entrants
The following players received wildcards into the singles main draw:
 Marco Chiudinelli
 Henri Laaksonen
 Frances Tiafoe

The following player received entry as a special exempt:
  Ruben Bemelmans

The following players received entry from the qualifying draw:
 Julien Benneteau
 Márton Fucsovics 
 Peter Gojowczyk 
 Mikhail Kukushkin

The following players received entry as lucky losers:
 Florian Mayer
 Vasek Pospisil

Withdrawals
Before the tournament
  Aljaž Bedene →replaced by  Vasek Pospisil
  Nick Kyrgios →replaced by  Borna Ćorić
  Gilles Müller →replaced by  João Sousa
  Rafael Nadal →replaced by  Donald Young
  Fernando Verdasco →replaced by  Florian Mayer

Retirements
  Florian Mayer
  Leonardo Mayer

Doubles main-draw entrants

Seeds

 Rankings are as of October 16, 2017

Other entrants
The following pairs received wildcards into the doubles main draw:
  Marco Chiudinelli /  Luca Margaroli 
  Marc-Andrea Hüsler /  Nenad Zimonjić

The following pair received entry from the qualifying draw:
  Marcus Daniell /  Dominic Inglot

Finals

Singles

 Roger Federer defeated  Juan Martín del Potro, 6–7(5–7), 6–4, 6–3

Doubles

  Ivan Dodig /  Marcel Granollers defeated  Fabrice Martin /  Édouard Roger-Vasselin, 7–5, 7–6(8–6)

References

External links
Official website

2017 ATP World Tour
2017
2017 in Swiss tennis
October 2017 sports events in Europe